Wattie Cooper is a former association football player who represented New Zealand at international level.

Cooper played two official A-international matches for the All Whites in 1927, both against the touring Canadians, the first a 1–0 win on 9 July 1927, the second a 1–4 loss on 23 July.

References 

Year of birth missing (living people)
Living people
New Zealand association footballers
New Zealand international footballers
Association footballers not categorized by position